Airport East station is an interchange station for Line 1 and Line 12 of Shenzhen Metro in Shenzhen, Guangdong Province, China. Line 1 platforms opened on 15 June 2011 and Line 12 platforms opened on 28 November 2022.

History
Since Terminals A and B at Shenzhen Bao'an International Airport have closed and been replaced by Terminal 3 in November 2013, this metro station no longer serves the airport. Bus number M417, which used to connect this station to the airport, has been suspended and replaced with limited service by bus M5. Passengers for the airport should alight at the Airport station on Line 11 to reach the new terminal.

Station layout

Exits

References

External links
 Shenzhen Metro Airport East Station (Chinese)
 Shenzhen Metro Airport East Station (English)

Railway stations in Guangdong
Shenzhen Metro stations
Bao'an District
Railway stations in China opened in 2011
Airport railway stations in China